Consisting of about 110 amino acids, the domain in winged-helix transcription factors (see Regulation of gene expression) has four helices and a two-strand beta-sheet.  

These proteins are classified into 19 families called FoxA-FoxS.  

Mutations in FoxP proteins are implicated in human autoimmune diseases.

See also
 FOX proteins

External links
 

Transcription factors